The Monkey's Uncle is a 1965 American comedy film starring Tommy Kirk as genius college student Merlin Jones and Annette Funicello (former Mouseketeer from The Mickey Mouse Club) as his girlfriend, Jennifer. The title plays on the idiom "monkey's uncle" and refers to a chimpanzee named Stanley, Merlin's legal "nephew" (because of a legal arrangement resulting from an experiment to raise Stanley as a human) who otherwise has little relevance to the plot. Jones invents a man-powered airplane and a sleep-learning system. The film is a sequel to 1964's The Misadventures of Merlin Jones.

Plot 
The film starts in court, where Merlin Jones legally adopts his monkey, Stanley.

Midvale College is told that a wealthy man, Mr. Astorbilt, will give a large donation, but he has a strange request—he challenges the school to build a man-powered flying machine. If they succeed by a certain date, they get the donation, otherwise it will go to a rival school.

Jones designs a lightweight airplane, powered by a propeller driven by bicycle pedals. Recognizing that even his football-jock friends won't be strong enough for such a feat, he develops a strength elixir (based on adrenaline), which should give the power that a man would need to get off the ground.

To get the jocks' support, he creates "an honest way to cheat", adapting the recently discovered sleep-learning method to help them pass a particularly hard history course. Once the jocks are asleep, a timer starts a phonograph player, with the sound of Merlin's girlfriend, Jennifer, reading their lessons to them. However, this backfires in class—asked to give an oral report, the jocks speak, but Jennifer's voice comes out. It eventually works out in the students' favor.

Jones gets the jocks' help, and the great day comes. The pilot drinks the elixir, then pedals off into the sky, winning the contest, but the "wealthy donor" is last seen fleeing from men in white coats, who want to take him back to the local mental hospital.

Principal cast

 Tommy Kirk as Merlin Jones
 Annette Funicello as Jennifer
 Leon Ames as Judge Holmsby
 Arthur O'Connell as Darius Green III
 Frank Faylen as Mr. Dearborne
 Leon Tyler as Leon 
 Norm Grabowski as Norman 
 Cheryl Miller as Lisa
 Connie Gilchrist as Mrs. Gossett
 Alan Hewitt as Professor Shattuck 
 Gage Clarke as College President
 Mark Goddard as Haywood
 Harry Holcombe as Regent 
 Alexander Lockwood as Regent 
 Harry Antrim as Regent
 Brian Wilson as himself
 Carl Wilson as himself
 Dennis Wilson as himself
 Al Jardine as himself
 Mike Love as himself

Production notes
The Misadventures of Merlin Jones had been a surprise hit, earning over $4 million in rentals for Disney and prompting a sequel. The film was announced in March 1964.

This production marks both Tommy Kirk's and Annette Funicello's last film for the studio. Mark Goddard, who plays Haywood (and is best known as Major Don West on television's Lost in Space), made his feature film debut in this film.

The screen credit for writing reads, "Screenplay by Tom and Helen August", which were pseudonyms used by Alfred Lewis Levitt and Helen Levitt, two writers who were blacklisted. The home-video release of the film restored the Levitts' credits.

Funicello (billed as "Annette") performs the title track with The Beach Boys over the opening credits. The song was written by the Disney song writing duo, Richard M. Sherman and Robert B. Sherman. Funicello recalled: "They were just beginning. They were wonderful guys and I feel fortunate that I was kind of in on the ground floor. We even worked together performing at Disneyland. Little did any of us know how successful they would become!" She did not know whose idea it had been to bring in the Beach Boys but felt it was "a stroke of brilliance. As silly as the song is in places, it really does rock and with the Beach Boys' amazing four-part harmonies, I could sing it without echo". She regarded singing with the group as the highlight of her film career at Disney.

Shortly after making the film, Funicello married her agent. This would be the last film she made for Disney until Lots of Luck.

Music
The title song, written by the Sherman Brothers, is performed by Funicello, with the Beach Boys providing background vocals. This song was covered in 2006 by Devo 2.0 on the album Disneymania, Volume 4.

Reception

Critical
Richard F. Shepard of The New York Times described The Monkey's Uncle as "an amusing film made with artless artfulness ... It all falls into bright, colorful and innocuous non sequitur and, in an hour and a half, you are through, mildly diverted and unburdened by message". Variety noted that the film, "like its predecessor, depends on gimmicks and some nutty situations, which provide mild amusement". Margaret Harford of the Los Angeles Times said that the film "disappoints as a lineal descendant of Disney's Absent Minded Professor but it can hardly miss with the young set". The Monthly Film Bulletin wrote that the film was "perhaps slightly funnier for being less extravagant than its predecessor".

Box office
The film was a box-office success, and earned $4,000,000.

Citations

Cited works

External links 
  
 
 

1965 films
1960s science fiction comedy films
American sequel films
American science fiction comedy films
American aviation films
1960s English-language films
Films scored by Buddy Baker (composer)
Films directed by Robert Stevenson
Films produced by Ron W. Miller
Films produced by Walt Disney
Films set in universities and colleges
Walt Disney Pictures films
1965 comedy films
1960s American films